Antonio Pacheco Massó (born 4 June 1964) is a retired Cuban baseball player, and is also a 3 times Olympic medalist. He coached the Cuba national baseball team to a silver medal at the 2008 Summer Olympics. He played for Japanese corporate team Shidax between 2002 and 2004. He has been a baseball instructor in the New York Yankees farm system since 2014.

References

External links
 

1964 births
Living people
Olympic baseball managers
Olympic baseball players of Cuba
Olympic gold medalists for Cuba
Olympic silver medalists for Cuba
Olympic medalists in baseball
Medalists at the 1992 Summer Olympics
Medalists at the 1996 Summer Olympics
Medalists at the 2000 Summer Olympics
Baseball players at the 1992 Summer Olympics
Baseball players at the 1996 Summer Olympics
Baseball players at the 2000 Summer Olympics
Pan American Games gold medalists for Cuba
Baseball players at the 1983 Pan American Games
Baseball players at the 1987 Pan American Games
Baseball players at the 1991 Pan American Games
Baseball players at the 1995 Pan American Games
Cuban expatriate baseball players in Japan
Pan American Games medalists in baseball
Central American and Caribbean Games gold medalists for Cuba
Competitors at the 1986 Central American and Caribbean Games
Competitors at the 1990 Central American and Caribbean Games
Competitors at the 1993 Central American and Caribbean Games
Competitors at the 1998 Central American and Caribbean Games
Goodwill Games medalists in baseball
Central American and Caribbean Games medalists in baseball
Competitors at the 1990 Goodwill Games
Medalists at the 1991 Pan American Games
Medalists at the 1995 Pan American Games